The Good Things in Life is an album by Tony Bennett, released in 1972. The album reached a peak position of number 196 on the Billboard Top LPs chart.  The back cover of the album features a painting by Mr Bennett of himself and conductor Robert Farnon.

Track listing
"The Good Things in Life" - (Leslie Bricusse, Anthony Newley)
"O Sole Mio" - (Eduardo di Capua, Giovanni Capurro, Alfredo Mazzucchi)
"Passing Strangers" - (Mel Mitchell, Rita Mann, Stanley Applebaum)
"End of a Love Affair" - (Edward C. Redding)
"Oh, Lady Be Good!" - (George Gershwin, Ira Gershwin).
"Blues for Breakfast" - (Jerry Gladstone, Matt Dennis)
"Mimi" - (Rodgers and Hart)
"Invitation" - (Bronisław Kaper, Paul Francis Webster)
"Someone to Light Up My Life" (Se Tudos Fossem Iguals a Voce) - (Antonio Carlos Jobim, Vinicius de Moraes)
"It Was You" - (Cy Coleman, James Lipton)
"Cute" - (Neal Hefti)
"The Midnight Sun" - (Lionel Hampton, Sonny Burke, Johnny Mercer)
"London By Night" - (Carroll Coates)
"The Good Things in Life (Closing)"

References

1972 albums
Tony Bennett albums
Verve Records albums